Adolf Herskovic (later Allan Herskovic; 1916–2011) was a male Yugoslav international table tennis player.

Table tennis career
He won a silver medal at the 1939 World Table Tennis Championships in the Swaythling Cup (men's team event) with Žarko Dolinar, Ladislav Hexner, Tibor Harangozo and Max Marinko for Yugoslavia.

He represented Italy from 1948 until 1950 before he changed his name to Allan from Adolf and emigrated to the United States where he captained the US team in 1974.

Personal life
He was of Jewish descent and lost his parents and a sister in concentration camps during the war. He took refuge in Italy with some brothers but was arrested and interned in a camp in Cosenza where he was freed by the allies in 1943. In the United States he was a member of the Jewish Athletic Club and played soccer and gymnastics.

See also
 List of table tennis players
 List of World Table Tennis Championships medalists

References

Yugoslav table tennis players
Italian male table tennis players
American male table tennis players
Yugoslav emigrants to the United States
1916 births
2011 deaths
World Table Tennis Championships medalists